Konalga can refer to:

 Konalga, Baskil
 Konalga, Bitlis